The A65 autoroute is a motorway in south west France.  Construction started in 2008 and it was officially opened on 14 December 2010. It connects Langon (Gironde) to Pau (Pyrénées-Atlantiques), with a toll payable of € 19.70 for the complete journey by car.

The construction project was initiated by CIACT, who announced the beginning of work in 2008. It was built by a joint venture A'LIENOR, 65% owned by Eiffage and 35% by SANEF, who will have effective control for 65 years.

The financing, construction and running of the motorway was borne by the private company with no public subsidy required. Funds of over one billion euros were needed from the shareholders and banks to finance the road.

Schedule
2006-2007 Decree of declaration of public utility (DUP). Final negotiation of the contract with the State, which will be published after the publication of the decree. Detailed studies into the detail and preliminary procedures to complete the work: Investigations and Hydraulics (legal issues on water). 
2008 land Acquisition and beginning of work 
Opened December 16, 2010.

Layout
The road increases the speed of journeys from Bordeaux to Pau by automobile. It offers an alternative to the RN134 and RD932 and RD934 (Landes and the Gironde). The road starts in Langon, near Bordeaux, at a junction with A62, then crosses the Gironde and the Eastern part of the Landes where it integrates the By-pass round  Aire-sur-l'Adour. Finally it heads through the northern Pyrénées-Atlantiques joining the A64 at Poey-de-Lescar, near Pau.

Environmental impact
The road consumes 2000 ha of virgin countryside, in particular sections of France's largest forest, Les Landes. It was predicted to require 4 million tons of aggregates in its construction.

Extension
The motorway was to be extended south, connecting Pau to Oloron-Sainte-Marie as the A650 but the project was abandoned in 2008. It would have started at the interchange with the A64 Bayonne - Toulouse autoroute at Poey-de-Lescar and would have run as far as the bypass of Oloron-Sainte-Marie. The ultimate aim would be to connect to the Somport Tunnel to Spain.

External links 

 A'LIENOR Autoroute de Gascogne A65 :  Pau - Langon
 A65 Motorway in Saratlas

References

A65